This is a list of people who have served as Lord Lieutenant of Ross-shire. The office was replaced by the Lord Lieutenant of Ross and Cromarty in 1891 through the operation of the Local Government (Scotland) Act 1889.

Francis Mackenzie, 1st Baron Seaforth 17 March 1794 – 11 January 1815
Sir Hector Mackenzie, 4th Baronet 29 September 1815 – 26 April 1826
Sir James Wemyss Mackenzie, 5th Baronet 1 May 1826 – 8 March 1843
Col. Hugh Duncan Baillie 21 March 1843 – 21 June 1866
Sir James Matheson, 1st Baronet 27 June 1866 – 31 December 1878
Duncan Davidson 18 February 1879 – 18 September 1881
Sir Kenneth Mackenzie, 6th Baronet 2 December 1881 – 15 May 1891
Mackenzie became Lord Lieutenant of Ross and Cromarty

References

Ross-shire
Lord-Lieutenants of Ross-shire